Shawn Michael Lynch (born July 25, 1979) is a former American football center who played with the Arizona Cardinals of the National Football League as well as the FC Barcelona Dragons and the Hamburg Sea Devils of NFL Europe. He played college football at Duke.

College football career 
Lynch redshirted his first year at Duke in 1997, then lettered for four years from 1998 to 2001. In 2001, he started all 11 games at center and was recognized as the school's most outstanding offensive lineman.

Professional football career

Kansas City Chiefs 
On April 26, 2002, Lynch signed with the Kansas City Chiefs as an undrafted rookie. The Chiefs released him on September 2, 2002.

FC Barcelona Dragons 
After being allocated to NFL Europe, Lynch signed with the FC Barcelona Dragons in 2003. He started all ten games of the 2003 season, which was the team's final season before folding.

Miami Dolphins 
On September 30, 2003, Lynch was signed to the Miami Dolphins practice squad. He remained on the practice squad for the entirety of the 2003 season. He was released by the Dolphins on August 30, 2004.

Hamburg Sea Devils 
Lynch signed with the Hamburg Sea Devils and played ten games with them in 2005, four of which were starts.

Minnesota Vikings 
On June 13, 2005, Lynch signed with the Minnesota Vikings. He was waived by the Vikings on August 22.

Arizona Cardinals 
On August 23, 2005, the Arizona Cardinals claimed Lynch off waivers. On September 11, 2005, in a game against the New York Giants, he became one of only a few players to start at center in their very first NFL game after going undrafted. He was released by the Cardinals two days later on September 13.

On November 22, the Cardinals re-signed Lynch. He played one more game with the team, a 17–13 loss to the Indianapolis Colts on January 1, 2006.

Lynch signed a one-year contract with the Cardinals on April 4, 2006. However, he was cut before the beginning of the season, on September 2, 2006.

References 

Living people
1979 births
American football centers
Arizona Cardinals players
Barcelona Dragons players
Hamburg Sea Devils players
Kansas City Chiefs players
Miami Dolphins players
Minnesota Vikings players

People from West Palm Beach, Florida
Players of American football from Florida
Duke Blue Devils football players